Frontier Hospital is a Level 2 Regional government funded hospital in Queenstown, Eastern Cape in South Africa.

The hospital departments include Emergency department, Paediatric ward, Maternity ward, Obstetrics, Gynaecology Services, Out Patients Department, Surgical Services, Medical Services, Operating Theatre & CSSD Services, Pharmacy, Anti-Retroviral (ARV) treatment for HIV/AIDS, Post Trauma Counseling Services, Dentistry, Physiotherapy, Occupational Services, Speech-Language and Hearing  Therapy Services, Audiology, Laboratory Services, X-ray Services, Laundry Services and Kitchen Services.

References
 Eastern Cape Department of Health website - Chris Hani District Hospitals

Hospitals in the Eastern Cape
Enoch Mgijima Local Municipality